The 2016 K3 League was the tenth season of amateur K3 League.

Before the start of the 2016 season, Seoul FC Martyrs withdrew from the league, but Buyeo FC, Siheung Citizen and Yangpyeong FC joined the league.

The top five teams of the regular season qualified for the championship playoffs, and winners of the regular season advanced to the final directly.

On the other hand, eight teams of participating teams had to be relegated to the K3 League Basic, founded as the second division of the K3 League in 2017. The bottom five teams of the regular season were directly relegated, and three losing teams were additionally relegated after the relegation playoffs, contested between four teams from 12th to 15th-placed team.

Teams

Regular season

Relegation playoffs

Bracket

Championship playoffs
When the first round and semi-final matches were finished as draws, their winners were decided on the regular season rankings without extra time and the penalty shoot-out.

Bracket

First round

Semi-final

Final

FC Pocheon won 4–2 on aggregate.

See also
 2016 in South Korean football
 2016 Korean FA Cup

References

External links

K3 League (2007–2019) seasons
2016 in South Korean football